Wojciech Rydz (9 March 1932 – 8 January 2018) was a Polish fencer. He competed in the individual and team épée events at the 1952 Summer Olympics.

References

1932 births
2018 deaths
Polish male fencers
Olympic fencers of Poland
Fencers at the 1952 Summer Olympics
People from Mysłowice
People from Silesian Voivodeship (1920–1939)
Sportspeople from Silesian Voivodeship